The Arizona State Mine Inspector is responsible for overseeing the safety and regulation of active and inactive mines in the state of Arizona in the United States. It is an independent, constitutionally-mandated office, elected to a four-year term. Arizona is the only state which fills this position through direct election.

Arizona has 600 working mines and an estimated 120,000 abandoned mines. As of 2013, the state had 4 mine inspectors.

Arizona House Representative Randall Friese introduced a bill in 2016 to change the position from elected to appointed. The bill failed to move out of committee.

In 2007, former inspector Douglas K. Martin was convicted of a felony conflict of interest from the illegal use of state vehicles and theft.

Former inspectors
G. H. Bolin, Democrat, 1912–1921
John F. White, Republican, 1921–1923
Tom C. Foster, Democrat,  1923–1945
Clifford J. Murdock, Democrat, 1945–1953
Edward Massey, Democrat, 1953–1959
R. V. Hersey, Democrat, 1959–1965
Verne C. McCutchan, Republican, 1965–1975
Bert C. Romero,  Democrat, 1975–1976
Verne C. McCutchan, Republican, 1976–1978
James H. McCutchan, Republican, 1979–1990
Douglas K. Martin, Republican, 1991–2007
Joe Hart, Republican, 2007–2021

References

External links
Constitution version 1
Constitution version 2
Official Website

Arizona State Mine Inspector
Government of Arizona
Mining in Arizona
Mining law and governance